Dalin Myślenice is a Polish sports club based in Myślenice with association football and wrestling sections.

The men's senior football team played for many years in the third national tier.

The volleyball sections split to firm a separate legal entity, but retained the original name. The women's volleyball team used to play in the top national division after gaining promotion by winning the second division in 2004.

Women's volleyball teams in Poland
Sport in Lesser Poland Voivodeship
Sports teams in Poland
Football clubs in Lesser Poland Voivodeship
Myślenice County